Ana Paola Madriñan Villegas (born 18 October 1973) is a road cyclist from Colombia. She won the time trial on the road at the Pan American Road and Track Championships. in 2009 and represented her nation at the 2003, 2004 and 2007 UCI Road World Championships. She won the Colombian National Road Race Championships in 2003 and 2008.

References

External links
 profile at Procyclingstats.com

1973 births
Colombian female cyclists
Living people
Place of birth missing (living people)
Central American and Caribbean Games silver medalists for Colombia
Competitors at the 2002 Central American and Caribbean Games
Central American and Caribbean Games medalists in cycling
20th-century Colombian women
21st-century Colombian women
Competitors at the 2010 Central American and Caribbean Games